Swifts Rugby League Football Club, commonly referred to as Swifts Bluebirds or simply as Swifts is an Australian semi-professional rugby league club based in Purga, Ipswich, Queensland. The club currently competes in the City of Ipswich Mayor's A Grade Cup. The club was founded in 1919.

History 
Swifts Rugby League Football Club was founded in 1919 as Booval Rugby League Football Club. The emblem used was a "Swift" Bluebird. It was chosen because it had a variety of attributes such as courage, speed and strength. Although, the original jersey colours consisted of sky blue and white, as well as black shorts, in 1951, the merger of Booval Swifts and All Sports has now added the colour red to the jersey.

In the 2019 finals, they eliminated Redbank Plains Bears with a 41–28 victory in week one of the finals, before defeating the Goodna & Districts Eagles 26-22 last weekend. On 15 September, the third placed, Swifts faced the minor premiers, Brothers Ipswich in the grand final.

Squad 
Current 2018 squad:

 Aaron Angareu
 Aaron Nemani
 Andrew Telea
 Aurangzeb Nuuola
 Brendan O'Reilly
 Brigg Hille
 Dale Palmer-Barton
 Edward Crooks
 Elliot Standfield
 Fernando Asiata
 Fine Faingaa
 Fiohiva Siale Faingaa
 Harold Mosby
 Heine Haworth
 Henry Povey
 Isimeeli Hafoka
 Javarn White
 Jaydn Callan
 Jesse Crossan
 Jesse Roberts
 Jordan Hemopo
 Kieren Saltner
 Kurtis Lingwoodock
 Liam Callan
 Michael Molloy
 Pio Seci
 Ratunaisa Vatuinaruku
 Riley Poimatagi
 Robert Fletcher
 Samuel O'Connell
 Scott Mace
 Sherrick Hemopo
 Stephen O'Donohue
 Stuart Webb
 Tele Salesa
 Totini - John Totini
 Tyran Chapman

Sponsors 
The sponsors of the club include:

 Swifts Old Boys
 Swifts Sports Club
 Raceview Hotel
 McDonalds Yamanto
 MNL WaterProofing
 TERMITRUST
 Winston Glades Car & Dog Wash
 Ace Electrical
 Hoffensetz Solicitors
 Seymour Quality Roofing
 Lime Lawyers
 Helloworld Ipswich City Mall
 Perkins Haulage
 GC Plumbing
 Bendigo Bank

References 

1919 establishments in Australia
Rugby clubs established in 1919
Purga, Queensland
Rugby league teams in Queensland
Sport in Ipswich, Queensland